The Name Chapter: Temptation is the fifth Korean-language extended play (EP) by South Korean boy band Tomorrow X Together. It was released on January 27, 2023, through Big Hit Music and Republic Records. It consists of five tracks, including the lead single "Sugar Rush Ride". In support of the EP, the group will embark on their second concert tour, Act: Sweet Mirage, beginning in March 2023.

Background and release 
Hybe Corporation, parent company of Big Hit Music, first revealed plans for Tomorrow X Together to release an EP in January 2023 at a corporate briefing on November 9, 2022. The group's new album series, The Name Chapter, was teased first during their performance at the 2022 Melon Music Awards on November 26 and again in a concept trailer uploaded to their official YouTube channel on December 3. The EP was formally announced on social media platforms on December 14 and released on January 27, 2023.

Music and lyrics 
The Name Chapter: Temptation has five tracks and includes a guest appearance by American rapper Coi Leray on the third, "Happy Fools". The EP was characterized as Tomorrow X Together's return to their "tried-and-true", "whimsical" themes and intricate storytelling, although this time from a more mature lens and inspired by the story of Peter Pan. Sonically, it was described by some media outlets as one of the group's more experimental projects thus far. The all-English opening track "Devil by the Window" features bass-heavy rhythms. Lead single "Sugar Rush Ride" follows, a "saccharine dance pop" song with "funky guitar riffs" and whistles. The next track, "Happy Fools", draws from bossa nova and R&B; all five members of the group contributed to the lyrics. "Tinnitus (Wanna Be a Rock)" is Tomorrow X Together's foray into Afrobeats, while the closing track "Farewell, Neverland" is a ballad with Latin influences.

Commercial performance 
Big Hit Music reported on January 10, 2023 that The Name Chapter: Temptation had sold over 1.56 million copies in pre-orders. According to the label, by January 25, pre-orders surpassed 2.16 million copies, a new career high for Tomorrow X Together.

The EP debuted at number one on the US Billboard 200 with 161,500 album-equivalent units, earning Tomorrow X Together their first number one in the country.

Track listing

Charts

Weekly charts

Monthly charts

Certifications

References

2023 EPs
Korean-language EPs
Tomorrow X Together albums
Hybe Corporation EPs
Republic Records EPs